KVHT (106.3 FM, "Classic Hits 106.3") is a radio station licensed to serve Vermillion, South Dakota.  The station is owned by 5 Star Communications, Inc. It airs a classic hits music format.

The station serves as the flagship station of the University of South Dakota football and men's and women's basketball teams. Women's basketball games that conflict with men's basketball games are broadcast on sister station KVTK.

The station was assigned the KVHT call letters by the Federal Communications Commission on May 7, 1990.

Programming
Until 1999, KVHT aired the syndicated oldies program "The Lost 45s" with Barry Scott.

Honors and awards
In May 2006, KVHT won one first place plaque in the commercial radio division of the South Dakota Associated Press Broadcasters Association news contest. The contest was for the 2005 calendar year.

In November 2006, the American Cancer Society recognized KVHT, Culhane Communications, and broadcaster Randy Hammer for "outstanding contributions in the fight against cancer." They were awarded the Media Mark of Excellence Award for radio in recognition of their "demonstrated commendable promotion of the American Cancer Society."

References

External links
KVHT official website

VHT
Classic hits radio stations in the United States
Clay County, South Dakota
Radio stations established in 1999
1999 establishments in South Dakota